Eighty-two Guggenheim Fellowships were awarded in 1942.

1942 U.S. and Canadian Fellows

1942 Latin American and Caribbean Fellows

See also
 Guggenheim Fellowship
 List of Guggenheim Fellowships awarded in 1941
 List of Guggenheim Fellowships awarded in 1943

References

1942
1942 awards